Sultan Farah Guled was a Somali ruler. He was the second Grand Sultan of the Isaaq Sultanate and also a Hajji having completed pilgrimage to Mecca.

Biography

Son of Sultan Guled, he was amongst the first generation of the Ba Ambaro branch of the emerging Guled dynasty, Farah was a member of the Eidagale branch of the Garhajis subclan of Isaaq.

Message to Saqr al Qasimi
When a British vessel named the Mary Anne attempted to dock in Berbera's port in 1825 it was attacked and multiple members of the crew were massacred by the Isaaq. In response the Royal Navy enforced a blockade and some accounts narrate a bombardment of the city. In 1827 two years later the British arrived and extended an offer to relieve the blockade which had halted Berbera's lucrative trade in exchange for indemnity. Following this initial suggestion the Battle of Berbera 1827 would break out. After the Isaaq defeat, 15,000 Spanish dollars was to be paid by the Isaaq leaders for the destruction of the ship and loss of life. In the 1820s the Isaaq Sultan Farah Guled   penned a letter to Sultan bin Saqr Al Qasimi of Ras Al Khaimah requesting military assistance and joint religious war against the British.
This would not materialize as Sultan Saqr was incapacitated by prior Persian Gulf campaign of 1819 and was unable to send aid to Berbera. Alongside their stronghold in the Persian Gulf & Gulf of Oman the Qasimi were very active both militarily and economically in the Gulf of Aden and were given to plunder and attack ships as far west as the Mocha on the Red Sea. They had numerous commercial ties with the Somalis, leading vessels from Ras Al Khaimah and the Persian Gulf to regularly attend trade fairs in the large ports of Berbera and Zeila and were very familiar with the Isaaq.

See also
Isaaq
Deria Sugulleh Ainashe
Garhajis
Habr Awal
Battle of Berbera 1827

References

Somalian Muslims
19th-century Somalian people
Year of birth missing
Year of death missing
Grand Sultans of the Isaaq Sultanate